Henry Alfred Clarke (23 February 1923 – 16 April 2000) was a professional footballer who spent his entire senior career at Tottenham Hotspur. He also represented England on one occasion.

Football career 
Clarke joined Spurs in March 1949 from Lovells Athletic. He played a total of 322 matches at centre half and netting four goals in all competitions between 1949 and 1956. A cornerstone of the push and run side of the early 1950s when he featured in all 42 matches of the Championship winning side of 1950–51. After retiring from competitive football, Clarke joined the club's coaching staff.

Clarke made his only appearance for England on 4 April 1954, against Scotland at Hampden Park in the 1953–54 British Home Championship. The match also served as a 1954 FIFA World Cup qualification tie.

References

External links 
A-Z of Tottenham Hotspur players

1923 births
2000 deaths
Footballers from Woodford, London
English footballers
English Football League players
Tottenham Hotspur F.C. players
England international footballers
Lovell's Athletic F.C. players
Association football fullbacks